Lola Smallwood-Cuevas is an American politician and a member of the California Senate. A Democrat, she represents the 28th Senate District.

References

External links 
Official Website

Campaign Website

Lola Smallwood-Cuevas at Ballotpedia

Democratic Party California state senators
Women state legislators in California
Living people
Year of birth missing (living people)
California State University, East Bay alumni
21st-century American women politicians